The Porsche GT3 Cup Challenge USA by Yokohama was a one-make racing series based in the United States using Porsche 911 GT3s.

The Porsche GT3 Cup Challenge USA by Yokohama entered its 16th & final season in 2020 and was the largest of Porsche's 20 single-make Cup Challenge series in the world. The series produces intense, exciting competition for semi-professional and aspiring professional drivers in the world's most produced and iconic race car, the Porsche 911 GT3 Cup.

Racing was divided into two classes – Platinum Cup, featuring the 2017-2019 Porsche 911 GT3 Cup car, which is based on the eighth (current) generation of the street car (991.2), and Gold Cup, featuring the 2014–2016 Porsche 911 GT3 Cup car, which is based on the seventh generation of the street car (991.1). A Masters Championship also is conducted in Platinum class, this class consists of drivers 45 years of age or older. Each class is awarded with its own podium at the end of every race and individual champion at the end of every season. Points are awarded by finish in class.

The series was sanctioned by the International Motor Sports Association, and was a support series to the WeatherTech SportsCar Championship. It has now been replaced by Porsche Carrera Cup North America starting in 2021.

Champions

References

External links
 

IMSA
Auto racing series in the United States
Auto racing series in Canada
International Motor Sports Association
One-make series